Samuel Edward Brotherton (born 29 October 1996) is a New Zealand professional footballer who plays as a defender for Forward Madison FC in USL League One. Brotherton also plays with the New Zealand national team.

Club career
Brotherton started his career in the ASB Premiership with Wanderers SC and made his debut in the opening of the 2014–15 ASB Premiership against Waitakere United in the 3–2 loss. He scored his first goal for the club in a 3–1 win over Canterbury United in round 8.

In 2015, he moved to the United States and signed for University of Wisconsin. Playing in the Big Ten Conference during his freshman year, Brotherton would go on to make 17 appearances in 19 games for Wisconsin.

Sunderland
On 1 February 2017, Brotherton completed a deal with English Premier League side Sunderland until the summer of 2019.

North Carolina FC
On 29 January 2019, Brotherton joined USL Championship side North Carolina FC.

Auckland City FC
Brotherton signed with Auckland City FC of the New Zealand Football Championship on January 22, 2021.

Forward Madison FC
Brotherton signed with Forward Madison FC of United States Division III league USL League One on January 16, 2023.

International career
Brotherton has represented New Zealand at several levels with his first representation being with the touring New Zealand under-19 schoolboys national team in England and Ireland in which he was vice captain. The team would go on to score wins against the U18 and U19 national teams of Ireland and Wales and draws against Scotland and England.

Brotherton was then announced in the New Zealand national under-20 football team for the 2015 FIFA U-20 World Cup which was to be held in New Zealand. Brotherton would go on to score his first international goal for New Zealand in the tournament in their 5–1 victory over Myanmar at Wellington Regional Stadium.

Brotherton was part of the New Zealand national under-23 football team that participated in the 2015 Pacific Games, which doubled as qualification for the Football at the 2016 Summer Olympics.

Brotherton's first senior international appearance would also arrive in 2015. He was called up to the squad to face South Korea in March, however did not make an appearance. He would however be recalled for New Zealand's friendly against Oman in Seeb, Oman. Brotherton played the whole 90 minutes in which New Zealand won 1–0.

References

External links
 University of Wisconsin Badgers - Sam Brotherton profile at the University of Wisconsin.
 
 

1995 births
Living people
Association football defenders
Association footballers from Auckland
Des Moines Menace players
New Zealand association footballers
New Zealand expatriate association footballers
New Zealand international footballers
People educated at Westlake Boys High School
Sunderland A.F.C. players
USL League Two players
Wisconsin Badgers men's soccer players
2016 OFC Nations Cup players
2017 FIFA Confederations Cup players
North Carolina FC players
Expatriate footballers in England
Expatriate soccer players in the United States
New Zealand expatriate sportspeople in England
New Zealand expatriate sportspeople in the United States
Forward Madison FC players